The 1999 Italian Open singles was the singles event of the fifty-fifth edition of the tennis tournament played at Rome, Italy, the most prestigious tennis tournament in Southern Europe. It was the fifth WTA Tier I tournament of the year, and part of the European claycourt season. Martina Hingis was the defending champion but lost in the semifinals to Venus Williams.

Williams won in the final 6–4, 6–2 against Mary Pierce.

Seeds
The top eight seeds received a bye to the second round.

Draw

Finals

Top half

Section 1

Section 2

Bottom half

Section 3

Section 4

Qualifying

Seeds

Qualifiers
{{columns-list|colwidth=30em|
  Germana Di Natale
  Sabine Appelmans
  María Vento
  Francesca Schiavone  Sandra Cacic  Elena Dementieva  Christína Papadáki  Antonella Serra Zanetti}}

Lucky losers
  Tatiana Panova'''

Qualifying draw

First qualifier

Second qualifier

Third qualifier

Fourth qualifier

Fifth qualifier

Sixth qualifier

Seventh qualifier

Eighth qualifier

External links
 ITF tournament draws

Women's Singles
Italian Open